Oh, God! Book II is a 1980 American comedy film and a sequel to the film Oh, God! (1977). It was directed by Gilbert Cates, and stars George Burns, Suzanne Pleshette, David Birney and Louanne Sirota. Joyce Brothers and Hugh Downs also made cameo appearances in the film.

Oh, God! Book II was followed by Oh, God! You Devil (1984). Burns was the only cast member who appeared in more than one of the films.

Synopsis
In this sequel, God asks the help of 11-year-old Tracy Richards (Louanne Sirota) to help promote Himself. Tracy creates the slogan "Think God" and soon has her friends spreading the message by posters, graffiti and other ways. But Tracy's parents and psychiatrists think the young girl is just insane. God is the only one that can straighten out the situation.

Main cast
 George Burns as God
 Suzanne Pleshette as Paula Richards
 David Birney as Don Richards
 Louanne Sirota as Tracy Richards
 John Louie as Shingo
 Wilfrid Hyde-White as Judge Thomas Miller
 Conrad Janis as Charles Benson, School Principal
 Hans Conried as Dr Barnes

Reception
As of 2021, this film has a 43% rating on Rotten Tomatoes, based on seven reviews with an average rating of 5.1/10.

References

External links

 
 
 

1980 films
1980s fantasy comedy films
American fantasy comedy films
American sequel films
1980s English-language films
Films about children
Films about God
Films based on American novels
Films based on fantasy novels
Films directed by Gilbert Cates
Films scored by Charles Fox
Warner Bros. films
1980 comedy films
1980s American films